Launceston South is an electoral division of Cornwall in the United Kingdom and returns one member to sit on Cornwall Council. The current Councillor is Jade Farrington, a standalone Independent.

Extent
Launceston South covers the south of the town of Launceston, including Withnoe and Stourscombe. The division covers 527 hectares in total.

Election results

2017 election

2013 election

2009 election

References

Launceston, Cornwall
Electoral divisions of Cornwall Council